Deputy lieutenants of Aberdeen are commissioned by the Lord Provost of Aberdeen who, since 1899 by virtue of office, is also Lord-Lieutenant of Aberdeen City.

The Lieutenancy Area of Aberdeen City was formerly known as the County of the City of Aberdeen - not to be confused with the County of Aberdeen, which is now known as Aberdeenshire.

19th Century
 12 January 1900: Alexander George Pirie, Chairman of Stoneywood Paper Mill
 12 January 1900: Alexander Milne Ogston
 12 January 1900: Thomas Ogilvie
 12 January 1900: James Murray
 12 January 1900: Daniel Mearns
 12 January 1900: Alexander Lyon Jnr.
 12 January 1900: Colonel Thomas Innes
 12 January 1900: Robert Henderson
 12 January 1900: Alexander Morison Gordon
 12 January 1900: Alexander Ogston Gill
 12 January 1900: John Fyfe
 12 January 1900: Theodore Crombie
 12 January 1900: Duncan Vernon Pirie, 
 12 January 1900: Sir David Stewart , former Provost of Aberdeen
 12 January 1900: Sir William Henderson 
 12 January 1900: Sir Alexander Baird 
 12 January 1900: Sir John Forbes Clark 
 12 January 1900: James Bryce, 1st Viscount Bryce, 
 12 January 1900: The Earl of Aberdeen
 12 January 1900: The Marquis of Huntly

20th century
 11 October 1905: William Meff jun.
 11 October 1905: Sir James Taggart, 
 10 September 1908: Sir John Fleming
 10 September 1908: Colonel James Ogston
 29 November 1910: Colonel Lachlan Mackinnon, Advocate
 27 October 1911: Major General Sir Alexander John Forsyth Reid, 
 26 April 1912: Alexander Wilson
 28 July 1915: Rt. Hon. Norman Buchan, 18th Earl of Caithness
 28 July 1915: Weetman Pearson, 1st Baron Cowdray
 28 July 1915: Major General Sir James Ronald Leslie Macdonald
 28 July 1915: Rt. Hon. Harold John Tennant
 28 July 1915: John Turner
 21 September 1917: Lieutenant-Colonel Sir Arthur Grant, 10th Baronet, 
 21 September 1917: Colonel William Andrew Mellis
 21 September 1917: Lieutenant-Colonel James Ochoncar Forbes
 5 August 1918: George Bennett Mitchell, 
 23 January 1920: Major William Yeats McDonald
 10 September 1925: Commander Wilfrid Bayley Pirie
 10 September 1925: Colonel Macbeth Moir Duncan, 
 10 September 1925: Colonel William Smith Gill
 10 September 1925: Colonel Thomas Ogilvie
 10 September 1925: Colonel John Scott Riddell, 
 2 August 1926: Lieutenant Harry Alexander Holmes
 11 February 1928: Robert Williams
 28 May 1928: Colonel Frederick Richard Gerrard Forsyth
 4 December 1929: Colonel Harry Jackson Kinghorn
 4 December 1929: Sir Andrew Jopp Williams Lewis
 5 April 1930: Colonel Frank Fleming
 5 April 1930: Brevet Colonel Sir John Marnoch, 
 16 February 1932: John Malcolm Fyfe
 18 October 1932: Honorary Major John Reid Dean
 15 February 1933: James Reid Rust
 30 March 1935: The Most Honourable The Marquis of Aberdeen and Temair, 
 30 March 1935: Colonel Thomas Fraser, 
 19 November 1935: Captain James Hay
 19 November 1935: Major Malcolm Vivian Hay
 14 January 1936: Henry Alexander
 15 December 1938: Lieutenant-Colonel Edward William Watt
 15 December 1938: Major Alexander Lyon
 15 December 1938: Honorary Colonel James Dawson
 8 April 1952: Lieutenant-Colonel Samuel McDonald, K.C  Also recipient of the Portuguese Order of Aviz, Companion of the Order of St Michael and St George and  honorary Sheriff-substitute of Angus and Forfar, Sheriff-substitute of Hamilton, Sheriff-substitute of Arbroath, Sheriff-substitute of Aberdeen, Kincardine and Banff, Legum Doctor (honorary degree - LL.D) and Sheriff Substitute of Lanarkshire.
 8 April 1952: Duncan Fraser, 
 8 April 1952: Sir Alexander Greig Anderson, 
 6 July 1953: William David Reid, 
 30 August 1956: Lieutenant Athol Benzie
 30 August 1956: Reverend Professor John Macdonald Graham, 
 30 August 1956: Colonel Edward Birnie Reid, 
 12 May 1959: Honorary Colonel Roy Brown Strathdee, 
 12 May 1959: Honorary Colonel Alexander Milne, 
 12 May 1959: Lieutenant-Colonel and Brevet Colonel Lachlan Mackinnon, 
 17 April 1964: George Stephen, 
 17 April 1964: Lieutenant-Colonel James Shankley
 17 April 1964: Lieutenant-Colonel and Brevet Colonel Thomas Patrick Edward Murray, 
 17 April 1964: Captain (Honorary Major) James Scott Gray Munro
 17 April 1964: Honorary Colonel John Cecil King, 
 17 April 1964: Lieutenant-Colonel and Brevet Colonel Douglas Edmond, 
 17 April 1964: Sir Ian Robert Algernon Forbes-Leith of Fyvie, 
 27 September 1965: Reverend Professor John Macdonald Graham, 
 1 May 1967: 	Honorary Major James Campbell Williamson
 1 May 1967: 	Colonel Alexander Logie Stalker
 1 May 1967: 	William Ranald Stewart Mellis
 1 May 1967: 	Lieutenant Richard Tunstall Ellis, 
 1 May 1967: 	Squadron Leader James Downie Campbell
 1 May 1967: 	Dr Logie Samuel Bain
 1 December 1970: Norman Hogg, 
 31 May 1978: Lieutenant James Fergus Watt
 31 May 1978: 	Frank Ramsay
 31 May 1978: 	Major David Maxwell Procter, 
 31 May 1978: 	Captain Kenneth Jamieson Peters, 
 31 May 1978: 	Lieutenant-Colonel Charles John Howell Mann, 
 31 May 1978: Lieutenant Joseph Robert Carry, 
 10 December 1992: Charles Leslie Robertson
 20 December 1993: William Wyllie,  (Appointed Vice Lord-Lieutenant 2004)
 12 September 1995: James Alexander Lamond
 12 September 1995: Audrey Anne Dawson, 
 12 September 1995: Alan John Codona
 29 April 1999: Philip Kivuva Muinde, 
 29 April 1999: Alison Skene,  (Appointed Vice Lord-Lieutenant on 4 January 2007)

21st century
 17 April 2003: Andrew Lawtie Appointed Vice Lord-Lieutenant on 3 September 2015.
 17 April 2003: Lavina Massie, 
 3 March 2005: Michael C. Hastie, former Councillor
 3 March 2005: Roy Hendry Thomson, 
 3 March 2005: Jennifer A. Shirreffs, 
 3 March 2005: Joseph Leiper, former Headmaster
 4 January 2007: John L. Langler
 17 January 2007: James Smith Milne, 
 7 December 2007: Forbes McCallum
 17 April 2008: Margurita Esson
 17 April 2008: Audrey Walker
 23 April 2010: Dennis Davidson
 16 March 2012: Beverley Graham
 5 December 2013: Sir Ian Diamond, Principal and Vice-Chancellor of the University of Aberdeen
 20 April 2015: Gregory Poon, 
 17 November 2015: Lady (Joan) Catto, 
 19 December 2017: William Young, former Aberdeen City Councillor
 19 December 2017: Isabel McIntyre
 December 2019: Gillian Milne
 December 2019: Graham Guyan
 March 2022: Avril Gray
 March 2022: Mike Melvin
 March 2022: Margaret Openshaw
 May 2022: Gail Mair

References

Deputy Lieutenants of Aberdeen
People associated with Aberdeen
History of Aberdeen
Deputy Lieutenants in Scotland
Aberdeen-related lists